Anderson Luiz Pinheiro (born 13 December 1981), known as Paquito, is a Brazilian footballer.

Club career
Born in Curitiba, Brazil, Paquito started his European career since arrived at Napoli in July 2000. In January 2001, his left for Serie B side Ravenna. On 1 July 2001, he was signed by Cosenza. He spent 2002–03 season on loan to Brazil and then left for Challenge League side Chiasso. In 2005–06 season, he played the round 1 match for Chiasso on 16 July 2005, but signed by Crotone soon after. In January 2006 he return to Chiasso, from Italian speaking region Ticino. In the next season he was signed by Swiss Super League side Luzern. He was out-favoured in the 2007–08 season, he left for Enosis Neon Paralimni then played with the Luzern B. In January 2009 he left for OFI Heraklion.

After a year without a club, he returned to Switzerland for Yverdon-Sport.

Privates 
He also holds an Italian passport and is the brother of Juninho.

References

External links
 CBF 
 Swiss Football League Profile  
 Lega-Calcio Profile 
 

1981 births
Living people
Brazilian footballers
Brazilian expatriate footballers
Serie B players
Swiss Super League players
Super League Greece players
Cypriot First Division players
S.S.C. Napoli players
Ravenna F.C. players
Cosenza Calcio 1914 players
Clube Atlético Juventus players
Mirassol Futebol Clube players
FC Chiasso players
F.C. Crotone players
FC Luzern players
Enosis Neon Paralimni FC players
OFI Crete F.C. players
Yverdon-Sport FC players
Expatriate footballers in Italy
Expatriate footballers in Switzerland
Expatriate footballers in Cyprus
Expatriate footballers in Greece
Association football midfielders
Brazilian expatriate sportspeople in Italy
Brazilian expatriate sportspeople in Switzerland
Brazilian expatriate sportspeople in Cyprus
Brazilian expatriate sportspeople in Greece
Footballers from Curitiba
Citizens of Italy through descent
Brazilian people of Italian descent